K Train or simply K may refer to:

K (Broadway Brooklyn Local), earlier KK, discontinued in 1976
K (Eighth Avenue Local), replaced the AA in 1985 and merged into the C in 1988
K Ingleside, Muni Metro line serving the West Portal and Ingleside neighborhoods
K Line (Los Angeles Metro), a light rail line in Los Angeles County, California